The Catholic Church in Lebanon is particularly complex, given the mix of rite-specific (Latin and Eastern Catholic) branches, yet its entire episcopate is joined in a special Assembly of the Catholic Patriarchs and Bishops of Lebanon.

The Latin pre-diocesan jurisdiction partakes in the Episcopal conference of the Arab region Latin bishops.

Four of the five Eastern Catholic churches (not the Chaldean Catholics) count Lebanese member(s) in their Patriarchal Synods, Antioch/Beirut being thrice a Patriarchal see in name and/or fact : 
 Synod of the Maronite Church (mainly Lebanese)
 Synod of the Greek-Melkite Catholic Church
 Synod of the Syriac Catholic Church (each with a major Lebanese component) 
 Synod of the Armenian Catholic Church.

There also is an Apostolic Nunciature to Lebanon as papal diplomatic representation (embassy-level), headquartered in Jounieh, but accredited in the national capital Beirut.

Current dioceses in Lebanon

Current Latin 
 (pre-diocesan) Apostolic Vicariate of Beirut, exempt, for all of Lebanon

Current Eastern Catholic (Arch)eparchies

Maronite 
(Antiochian Rite)
 Maronite Catholic Patriarchate of Antioch and the Whole Levant, at Beirut (Lebanon), Chief of the church, with a sole Suffragan in the proper province of the Patriarch of Antioch:
 Maronite Catholic Eparchy of Joubbé, Sarba and Jounieh (Jebbeh–Sarba–Jounieh) 
 also immediately subject to the Patriarch, in Lebanon : 
 Maronite Catholic Archeparchy of Antelias
 Maronite Catholic Eparchy of Baalbek-Deir El Ahmar (Baalbek–Deir Al-Ahmar)
 Maronite Catholic Eparchy of Batroun
 Maronite Catholic Archeparchy of Beirut
 Maronite Catholic Eparchy of Byblos
 Maronite Catholic Eparchy of Sidon (Saïdā)
 Maronite Catholic Archeparchy of Tripoli
 Maronite Catholic Archeparchy of Tyre (Tyr)
 Maronite Catholic Eparchy of Zahleh (Zahlé)

Melkite (Greek) Catholic 
(Byzantine Rite )

 Melkite Greek Catholic Archeparchy of Baalbek
 Melkite Greek Catholic Archeparchy of Beirut and Byblos (nominally Metropolitan)
 Metropolitan Melkite Greek Catholic Archeparchy of Tyre, with three Lebanese archiepiscopal suffragans :
 Melkite Greek Catholic Archeparchy of Baniyas and Marjeyoun 
 Melkite Greek Catholic Archeparchy of Sidon (Saïda) and Deir el-Kamar 
 Melkite Greek Catholic Archeparchy of Tripoli 
 Melkite Greek Catholic Archeparchy of Zahle and Forzol and all the Bekaa

Armenian Catholic 
(Armenian Rite in Armenian language)

 Armenian Catholic Patriarchate of Cilicia, the patriarchal head of the particular church for the whole Armenian rite, with cathedral see in Beirut, Lebanon, as Metropolitan Archeparch (Archbishop), with four suffragan eparchies, including one Lebanese :
 Armenian Catholic Archeparchy of Beirut, the Proper (arch)eparchy of the Armenian Catholic Patriarch, in Lebanon and Turkey

Chaldean Catholic 
(Syro-Oriental Rite)

 Chaldean Catholic Eparchy of Beirut

Syriac Catholic 
(Antiochian Rite)

 Syriac Catholic Patriarchate of Antioch, with a cathedral see in Beirut, for Lebanon, with a single suffragan, for the same proper eparchy (diocese) of the Patriarch:
 Syriac Catholic Eparchy of Beirut.

Defunct jurisdictions

Titular sees 

 One (Latin) Metropolitan Titular archbishopric : Tyrus (Tyre)
 One (Latin) Non-Metropolitan Titular archbishopric : Heliopolis in Phœnicia
 Eleven Episcopal Titular bishoprics :
 nine Latin Titular bishoprics : Aradus (Ruâd island), Arca in Phoenicia of the Romans ('Argah), Botrys (Batrun), Jableh, Orthosias in Phoenicia (ruins of Bordj-Hacmon-El-Yeoudi), Rachlea (Marakya?, Rakhlé?), Sarepta of the Romans (Sarfend, Sarafand), Sidon (Saïda), Tripolis in Phœnicia
 two Eastern Catholic (both Maronite) Titular bishoprics : Arca in Phœnicia of the Maronites ('Argah), Sarepta of the Maronites.

Other 
(Eastern Catholic : Antiochian Rite)
 Maronite Eparchy of Eden

See also 
 List of Catholic dioceses (structured view)
 Phoenice (Roman province), notably for titular sees
 Maronite Christianity in Lebanon
 Melkite Christianity in Lebanon

Sources and external links 
 GCatholic - data for all sections

Lebanon
Catholic dioceses